Ron Maag (born in 1945) is a former Republican member of the Ohio House of Representatives, serving in the House from 2009 to 2016.

Career
After graduation from the University of Cincinnati, Maag went on to work for Bristol-Myers Squibb Company. He also served as a board member with the Warren County Farm Bureau.

Ohio House of Representatives
With incumbent Michelle Schneider unable to run due to term limits, Maag was one of three who sought to replace her. He ended up winning the primary with about 40% of the electorate. Because of no Democrat being fielded for the 35th District in 2008, Maag was uncontested in the general election.

In his first reelection bid, Maag again faced primary opposition from fellow Republican Ginger Kubala, however was victorious by over 5,000 votes. He was easily reelected in the 2010 general election.  Currently, Maag serves on the committees of Finance and Appropriations and its Primary and Secondary Education Subcommittee; State Government and Elections (as vice chair); Education; and Ways and Means. He also serves on the Warren County Transportation Improvement District Board of Trustees.

In 2012, Maag won a third term, now representing the 62nd district, with 71.05% of the vote over Democrat Mike Kassalen.  He won a final term before facing term limits in 2014 with almost 72% of the vote.

Initiatives and positions
In his first legislation of the new Assembly, Maag introduced a bill to address sexting.

Maag has also introduced a resolution to give Ohioans an opportunity to weigh in on the federal health care law, and specify their thoughts about health care issues.

References

Living people
Republican Party members of the Ohio House of Representatives
1945 births
University of Cincinnati alumni
21st-century American politicians